Charles Euston Nurse (12 June 1909 – 14 October 1981) was Archdeacon of Carlisle and a Residentiary Canon at Carlisle Cathedral from 1958 until 1970 and 1973 respectively.

He was educated at Windermere Grammar School and Gonville and Caius College, Cambridge; and ordained in 1933. After a curacy at Holy Trinity, Carlisle he served incumbencies in Whitehaven, Barrow-in-Furness and Dalton before his Carlisle appointments.

Notes
 

 

1909 births
People educated at Windermere Grammar School
Alumni of Gonville and Caius College, Cambridge
Somerset Light Infantry officers
Archdeacons of Carlisle
1981 deaths